Ingrid Croce (née Jacobson, born April 27, 1947) is an American author, singer-songwriter and restaurateur. She is the widow of the singer-songwriter Jim Croce and the mother of the singer-songwriter A.J. Croce. Between 1964 and 1971, Ingrid and Jim Croce performed as a duo. In 1969, Capitol Records released their album, Jim & Ingrid Croce. Their song "Age" won a country music award in the late 1970s.

Biography

Early life
Croce was raised in Philadelphia, Pennsylvania, in a Jewish family. When she was eight, she worked at her grandmother's dress store in South Philadelphia. Her mother, Shirley, played piano on her own local television show. She learned to cook with her and started singing in local clubs and on television by the time she was 10. Her father, Sidney Jacobson, was a general practitioner with his medical office in their home in West Philadelphia. By the age of 15, she was employed as the junior art therapist assisting her father at the University of Pennsylvania where he did his residency for his psychiatric practice.

Before Ingrid's sixteenth birthday, her mother died at the age of 36 from breast cancer and a weak heart. She left high school and gymnastics and moved to her father's home in the suburbs. She and her twin sister, Phyllis, attended several high schools after the death of their mother. They graduated from Nether Providence High School in 1965. Croce attended Rhode Island School of Design and Moore College of Art and travelled to Mexico in her senior year when she won a fellowship to study painting and pottery in San Miguel de Allende.

With Jim Croce
When Jim Croce and Ingrid discovered they were going to have a child, Jim became more determined to make music his profession. He sent a cassette of his new songs to a friend and producer in New York City in the hope that he could get a record deal. When their son Adrian James Croce (A.J. Croce) was born in September 1971, Ingrid became a stay-at-home mother, while Jim went on the road to promote his music.

Two years later, as Jim Croce's songs were topping the music charts, his plane crashed in Natchitoches, Louisiana, on September 20, 1973, a week before A.J.'s second birthday. After Jim died, Ingrid and A.J. spent time in Quepos, Costa Rica. After they moved to San Diego, she developed a Head Start program for Costa Rica, opened a children's school in Point Loma, and wrote a children's book, Mirandome. When A.J. was almost four years old, he was temporarily blinded by serious physical abuse at the hands of Ingrid Croce's boyfriend.

From 1977 to 1981, Croce was the vice-consul of Costa Rica in San Diego. She wrote and sang songs, completed two solo albums, and started the publishing company Time in a Bottle. She sat on the board of the Woman's Bank and traveled to Israel, where A.J. took his rites of passage. In 1983, she became a dedicated runner and finished the Stockholm Marathon, taking third place in her category. In 1984, while on the road promoting her albums, she lost her voice because of tumors on her vocal cords. Two operations failed to restore her voice.

Restaurant business
At the suggestion of a friend, Croce opened a restaurant, Blinchiki, in 1985. It was built in downtown San Diego, at a place where Jim Croce had joked in 1973 about opening Croce's Restaurant & Jazz Bar. She used the location and the name Croce's as a tribute to her husband. From 1985–1988, Croce's expanded five times adding Croce's Jazz Bar, a second restaurant, a rhythm and blues bar, Croce's Top Hat Bar and Grill, Upstairs at Croce's, and Croce's Catering and Event Planners.

In the late 1980s, she became a board member of the California Restaurant Association, San Diego County Chapter, and the San Diego Convention & Visitors Bureau. In 2004, her determination to build San Diego into a top  dining destination led her to launch San Diego Restaurant Week. In 2010, the event drew 200,000 guests to close to 200 restaurants twice a year.

In 2014, Croce closed the downtown business and re-opened in Bankers Hill as Croce's Park West. The restaurant had dining, bar and terrace areas, plus a large room at the back for live music. That business model turned out to be unviable and the restaurant closed two years later.

Reflections
In 1996, Croce wrote Time in a Bottle, an autobiographical cookbook with memories and recipes from Croce's Restaurant. When the book sold out, guests to her restaurant and website were encouraging and she re-issued the book through her own publishing company, Avalanche Records and Books, in 1998.

In 2003, thirty years after Jim Croce's death, Ingrid Croce and A.J. Croce released the DVD Have You Heard Jim Croce Live, with an album of the same name, the album Jim Croce, Home Recordings, Americana and the album Facets (Jim Croce's first album from 1966). PBS broadcast the documentary The Legacy of Jim Croce, with commentary by Ingrid and A.J. and with segments from their DVD.

In 2004, Croce published Thyme in a Bottle, a photographic memoir of Jim's songs with lyrics and her favorite photos, compiled in collaboration with her husband, Jim Rock, and Deborah Ogburn.

Awards and honors
 San Diego County Women's Hall of Fame, 2012

References

External links
 Ingrid Croce's Website
 Jim Croce Official Website

1947 births
Living people
American women restaurateurs
American restaurateurs
Jewish American songwriters
Singer-songwriters from Pennsylvania
Writers from Philadelphia
Moore College of Art and Design alumni
American twins
American women singer-songwriters
20th-century American singers
20th-century American women singers
20th-century American businesspeople
20th-century American businesswomen
Businesspeople from Philadelphia
21st-century American Jews
21st-century American women